Sir Leonard Ropner, 1st Baronet, MC, DL (26 February 1895 – 12 October 1977) was a Conservative Party politician in the United Kingdom.

Background

Ropner was the son of William Ropner, third son of Sir Robert Ropner, 1st Baronet. Leonard's grandfather, Sir Robert, had come from Germany in 1857 and founded a fleet of merchant ships; as MP he represented Stockton-on-Tees.

He was educated at Oatlands, Harrogate and Harrow, obtaining a scholarship to Clare College, Cambridge and took a degree in Political Economy. He was a director of the family business of Sir R. Ropner and Co., the shipping company.

Career
He enlisted in 1914 in the Royal Artillery and commanded a battery in France, being awarded the Military Cross in 1919. After the war he commanded the Durham Heavy Brigade of the Royal Garrison Artillery in the Territorial Army in the rank of major, and was later appointed their honorary colonel.

At the 1923 general election, he was elected Member of Parliament (MP) for Sedgefield in County Durham, with a majority of only 6 votes over the sitting Labour MP John Herriotts. Ropner held the seat at the 1924 general election with a more comfortable majority of 1,416, but lost to Herriotts at the 1929 general election.

He returned to the House of Commons at the 1931 general election, for the safe Conservative seat of Barkston Ash in the West Riding of Yorkshire. He represented the constituency until he retired from Parliament at the 1964 general election, although his majority was cut to only 116 votes at the 1945 election. In 1937, he served as High Sheriff of Durham.

In 1952, he was made a baronet of Thorp Perrow in the North Riding of the County of York. The Thorp Perrow estate near Bedale had been bought by his father in 1927. Sir Leonard planted the  Thorp Perrow Arboretum.

References

Sources

External links 
 

1895 births
1977 deaths
People educated at Harrow School
Alumni of Clare College, Cambridge
Recipients of the Military Cross
Baronets in the Baronetage of the United Kingdom
Conservative Party (UK) MPs for English constituencies
Deputy Lieutenants of Durham
UK MPs 1923–1924
UK MPs 1924–1929
UK MPs 1931–1935
UK MPs 1935–1945
UK MPs 1945–1950
UK MPs 1950–1951
UK MPs 1951–1955
UK MPs 1955–1959
UK MPs 1959–1964
Royal Artillery officers
British Army personnel of World War I
High Sheriffs of Durham